Malahide is an affluent coastal settlement in Fingal, County Dublin, Ireland, situated  north of Dublin city. It has a village centre surrounded by suburban housing estates, with a population of over 17,000.

Malahide Castle dates from the 12th century and is surrounded by a large park, part of which incorporates an international cricket ground. The area also features a sandy beach, a marina, and a variety of sporting clubs.

Etymology
The modern name Malahide comes from "Mullach Íde", possibly meaning "the hill of Íde" or "Íde's sand-hill"; it could also mean "Sand-hills of the Hydes" (from Mullac h-Íde), in turn probably referring to a Norman family from the Donabate area. According to the Placenames Database of Ireland the name Malahide is possibly derived from the Irish "Baile Átha Thíd" meaning "the town of the ford of Thíd", which may have been a ford at the mouth of the Gaybrook Stream, on the road to Swords. Malahide Bay was anciently called Inber Domnann, the "river-mouth of the Fir Domnann".

Location and access

It is situated on the southern shore of an estuary where the Broadmeadow River comes to the sea; on the opposite side of the estuary is Kilcrea, and, some way inland, Donabate. To the west of the village, the Gay Brook or Gaybrook Stream passes through Yellow Walls, once a small separate village, to reach the estuary in a marshy area.

The village is served by the DART and some mainline rail services, run by Irish Rail. The Dublin Bus 32, 42 and 102, the 32X and 142 peak hour express services, and the 42N Nite-Link route serve the town from Dublin City Centre. Route 102 serves local areas to/from Dublin Airport (via Swords) and Sutton Station (via Portmarnock).

Malahide is close to the M1 motorway. To travel to Malahide by car, one would exit the M1 at Junction 4, travel along the R132 Swords Bypass, and then finally onto the R106 and into Malahide.

History

While there are some remnants of prehistoric activity, Malahide is known to have become a persistent settlement from the coming of the Vikings, who landed in 795 and used Malahide Estuary (along with Baldoyle Bay, where they had a longphort) as a convenient base. With the arrival of the Anglo-Normans, the last Danish King of Dublin retired to the area in 1170.

Malahide Castle, which dominates the area, was constructed after Henry II granted an extensive area of land north of Dublin to Sir Richard Talbot in 1176. The castle evolved from this, and remained in the hands of the Talbot family until 1976, aside from a short period where it was seized by Oliver Cromwell. 

There is an ancient covered well, St. Sylvester's, on the old main street (Old Street, previously Chapel Street), which used to have a "pattern" to Our Lady each 15 August.

In 1475 Thomas Talbot, head of the Talbot family of Malahide Castle, was granted the title Admiral of the port of Malahide by King Edward IV, with power to hold admiralty courts and levy customs duties on all merchandise coming into the port. The office was hereditary, and the family's right to act as Admiral was confirmed by the Court of Exchequer (Ireland) in 1639.

By the early 19th century, the village had a population of over 1000, and a number of local industries, including salt harvesting, while the harbour continued in commercial operation, with landings of coal and construction materials. By 1831, the population had reached 1223. The area grew in popularity in Georgian times as a seaside resort for wealthy Dublin city dwellers. This is still evident today from the fine collection of Georgian houses in the town and along the seafront, and Malahide is still a popular spot for day-trippers, especially in the summer months.

In the 1960s, developers began to build housing estates around the village core of Malahide, launching the first, Ard na Mara, in 1964. Further estates followed, to the northwest, south and west, but the village core remained intact, with the addition of a "marina apartment complex" development, adjacent to the coastal village green.

There are many shops and service outlets in the village core, including a small shopping centre, a supermarket, fashion boutiques, hair and beauty salons, florists, art galleries, book shops, food outlets, and a service station. There are multiple pubs (including Gibney's, Fowler's, Duffy's and Gilbert and Wright's), cafés and restaurants, and there is also the historic 203-room Grand Hotel. Malahide has the highest median household income of any large census town in Ireland, according to the Central Statistics Office (CSO).

Governance
Malahide is part of the Dáil Éireann constituency of Dublin Fingal, whose five representatives, elected in 2020, are Louise O'Reilly (Sinn Féin), Joe O'Brien (Green Party), Duncan Smith (Labour), Darragh O'Brien (Fianna Fáil), and Alan Farrell (Fine Gael).

Malahide forms part of the Howth–Malahide local electoral area (LEA) of Fingal County Council. The current representatives of the eight-seat constituency are Joan Hopkins (Social Democrats); Eoghan O'Brien (Fianna Fáil); Daire Ní Laoi (Sinn Féin); Jimmy Guerin (Independent); Anthony Lavin (Fine Gael); Brian McDonagh (Labour); David Healy (Green Party); and Keith Redmond (Independent). Hopkins was co-opted to fill the seat vacated by Cian O'Callaghan upon his election to Dáil Éireann in the neighbouring constituency of Dublin Bay North.

Malahide is also a civil parish in the ancient barony of Coolock within the historic County Dublin.

Leisure and organisations

Near to the village itself is a regional park formed from  Malahide Castle and its demesne, including gardens. This was once the estate of the Baron Talbot of Malahide family. Aside from Malahide Castle Demesne, there are a number of smaller parks (with further spaces planned, for example, at Robswall and Seamount). There are several golf courses nearby, and GAA, soccer, tennis, rugby, yacht clubs and Sea Scouts. Malahide also has a substantial marina.

The Malahide area has more than twenty residents' associations, sixteen of which, as of May 2007, worked together through the Malahide Community Forum, which publishes a quarterly newsletter, The Malahide Guardian.

There is a Lions club, a camera club, a musical and drama society, the Enchiriadis choirs, a chess club and a photography group which has published calendars. The Malahide Pipe Band was established in 1954 and still practices in the same area, in Yellow Walls, today. The band comprises pipers and drummers playing the bagpipes and snare, tenor and bass drums, and plays at various events locally, and in competitions around the country in the summer months. The band has also been involved in running a Pipe Band Competition on the grounds of Malahide Castle for a number of years.

In 1990, Malahide won the Irish Tidy Towns Competition.

Historical society and museum
Malahide Historical Society collects materials of local and general historical interest, arranges talks, and operates a museum on the grounds of Malahide Castle. The museum first opened in the cottage at the main vehicular entrance to Malahide Demesne, in 1988. It moved to the Craft Courtyard in 2007 but closed in 2012, with the collection being stored. It reopened in a new format in some rooms in the Steward's House, by the coach parking, and offers free access.

Malahide Sea Scouts
Malahide Sea Scouts (9th Port of Dublin) was founded in 1919 and has 635 members making it the largest Scout Group in Ireland and largest Scout Group in Europe. Malahide Sea Scouts offers a Sea Scouting programme to boys and girls of 6 to 26 years of age from the Scout Den on James's Terrace, and Sea Scouts can be seen sailing, rowing, paddling, swimming and powerboating. It has had several notable members including; Adam Clayton, Dave Evans (Edge), Richard (Dik) Evans, John Kilraine, Mark Little, Philip Quinn, Richard Burrows, Scott Flanigan, Eamon Falvey, Karl Deeter, Kevin Dundon, Philip Walton. In 2019, Malahide Sea Scouts celebrated its centenary.

Sport
There are also a wide variety of sports clubs within the Malahide area. Rugby, soccer, GAA sports, sailing, hockey, golf, cricket, tennis and basketball are all well represented.

Rugby
Malahide Rugby Club is located in a modern clubhouse and sports ground opposite the scenic Malahide estuary on Estuary Road. Founded in 1922, Malahide Rugby Club had to disband during World War II due to a lack of available players. However, in 1978 the club was reformed. It now fields three senior men's teams, one women's team, four youth teams and six "mini" rugby teams.

Soccer
Malahide United AFC was founded in 1944 and currently fields 60 schoolboy/girl teams, from Under 7 to Under 18, and 4 senior teams. They have an Academy catering for 5-, 6- and 7-year-olds. With over 1,000 registered players, Malahide United is one of the largest clubs in Ireland. The home ground is Gannon Park, which comprises two 11-a-side pitches, one 7-a-side pitch, one 11-a-side floodlit all-weather pitch, one floodlit 5-a-side/warm-up all-weather pitch and full clubhouse facilities.  Further pitches are used in Malahide Castle (two 7/9-a-sides and three 11-a-sides) with a further 11-a-side pitch in Broomfield, Malahide.

Aston Village FC was established in 1994. Their current home ground is by Malahide Castle, and a local company is their main sponsor. They have three senior teams, competing in both the U.C.F.L and the A.U.L leagues. Although small in size they still cater for up to 100 senior players with ages ranging from 16 – 43 years of age.

Atlético Malahide was established in 2015 by a group of younger players. Their current home pitch is on Malahide Castle grounds. Atletico's team consists of young men aged 19–25. In 2019 the team won their first silverware and following several promotions currently plays in the UCFL Division 1.

Tennis
There are two tennis clubs in the area: Malahide Lawn Tennis & Croquet Club, founded in 1879, is one of the oldest tennis clubs in Ireland. The club is situated in the centre of Malahide village, overlooking the outer Broadmeadow estuary. Grove Lawn Tennis Club is a grass court tennis club.

Gaelic games
St Sylvesters is the local Gaelic Athletic Association club.

Golf
Malahide Golf Club opened in 1892, moving to a new location in 1990. It has a 2-storey clubhouse completed in May 1990, with 1,000 square metres, including bars, a restaurant, a conference room and a snooker room. The 17th is a notoriously difficult hole known to locals as "Cromwell's Delight", due to its narrow fairways and dominant bunkers.

Sailing
 
There are two sailing clubs situated on the estuary; Swords Sailing & Boating Club and Malahide Yacht Club. The inner, Broadmeadow (Bromwell) estuary is also the home of Fingal Sailing School and DMG Sailsports based in the 350-berth marina.

Hockey
Malahide Fingal Hockey Club was formed from the amalgamation of Malahide Hockey Club and Fingal Hockey Club (formerly Aer Lingus). An all-female club, they currently field four senior teams and have a junior section of nine teams aged between 7 and 16. All teams for play and train in Broomfield Malahide.

Cricket
Malahide Cricket Club was founded in 1861 and the ground is situated within Malahide Castle demesne, near the railway station. The ground has hosted Test cricket and One Day Internationals.

Basketball
Malahide Basketball Club was formed in 1977, and as of 2017, fields 2 senior ladies' teams, 2 senior men's teams and 15 junior girls and boys teams (from under 10 to under 18). They train and play their home matches at Malahide Community School and Holywell Community Centre.

Education
There are five schools in the environs of Malahide, four primaries (Pope John Paul II National School, St. Andrews National School, St. Oliver Plunkett Primary School, and St. Sylvester's Infant School) and one secondary (Pobal Scoil Iosa, Malahide).

Religion

Malahide has two Catholic parishes, St. Sylvester's and Yellow Walls, and one Church of Ireland parish (St. Andrews), and also forms part of a Presbyterian community, with a church built in 1956 as the first Presbyterian church in the Republic of Ireland since 1922 (it is one of two churches of the Congregation of Howth and Malahide).

Transport

Trains
Malahide railway station opened on 25 May 1844. It is now one of the northern termini of the DART system, (the other being Howth). The station features a heritage garden and a decorative ironwork canopy, which contains the monogram of the Great Northern Railway ('GNR'), who operated the route prior to the nationalisation of the railways.

The railway crosses the Broadmeadow estuary on the Broadmeadow viaduct, known locally as The Arches. The original viaduct was a wooden structure built in 1844, which was replaced with an iron structure in 1860 and a pre-cast structure in 1966-7.

Viaduct collapse

On 21 August 2009, the 18:07 train from Balbriggan to Connolly was passing over the 200-year-old viaduct when the driver noticed subsidence and the embankment giving way on the northbound track. The train passed over the bridge before it collapsed and the driver alerted authorities. An inquiry was to investigate the possibility that seabed erosion was the primary cause of the collapse. 
A member of Malahide Sea Scouts, Ivan Barrett, had contacted Iarnród Éireann five days before the collapse about possible damage to the viaduct and a change in water flow around it.

Buses
Dublin Bus provides bus services in the area on routes H2, 32X, 42, 42N, 102 and 142:
Route H2 connects Malahide with Portmarnock, Baldoyle, Howth Road, Raheny, Killester, Clontarf West, Fairview, Connolly Railway Station and terminates at Abbey Street.
Route 32X connects Seabury, Malahide, Portmarnock, Baldoyle, Clontarf Road, Fairview, Connolly Railway Station, Saint Stephen's Green, Leeson Street, Donnybrook Village, RTÉ and terminates at UCD's Belfield campus.
Route 42 connects The Hill, Malahide Village, Seabury, Kinsealy, Clare Hall, Coolock, Malahide Road, Artane Roundabout, Donnycarney Church, Fairview, Connolly Railway Station and terminates at Eden Quay.
Route 42N is Friday and Saturday only route which serves Kinsealy, Seabury, Malahide Village, Portmarnock (Coast Road), Wendell Avenue, Carrickhill Road, Strand Road and Portmarnock.
Route 102 serves Malahide village en route to Seabury, Waterside, Mountgorry Way, Pavilions Shopping Centre, Swords Main Street, Boriomhe, River Valley and terminates at Dublin Airport.  In other direction this route serves Coast Road, Sand's Hotel, Wendell Avenue, Carrickhill Road, Portmarnock, Strand Road, Baldoyle and terminates at Sutton Dart Station. On 2 December 2018, this route was taken over by Go-Ahead Ireland.
Route 142 connects The Hill, Malahide Village, Seabury, Waterside, Mountgorry Way, Holywell, M1, Port Tunnel, City Quays, Saint Stephens Green, Rathmines, Palmerston Park, Dartry Road, Milltown Road, Bird Avenue and terminates at UCD Belfield.  It operates in morning and evening peak Monday to Friday only.

People

Former and current residents include:
 Cecelia Ahern, author
 Georgina Ahern, model and writer
 Vincent Browne, journalist
 Nicky Byrne of Westlife
 Brendan Gleeson, Hollywood actor
 Jameson Irish Whiskey family
 Robbie Keane, Irish international soccer player 
 Ronan Keating, singer for Boyzone
 James Vincent McMorrow, musician
 Conor O'Brien (Villagers), musician
 Richard Talbot, 1st Earl of Tyrconnell
 Peter Talbot, Roman Catholic Archbishop of Dublin
 Suzanne Jackson-O’Connor, Founder of SoSueMe and TV presenter in RTE's The Style Councillors

People born and/or raised in Malahide include:
 Sinéad Aherne, All-Ireland winner with the Dublin senior ladies' footballer
 Adam Clayton, U2 musician
 Dinny Corcoran, footballer for Bohemian FC
 Director (band), rock group
 The Edge, U2 musician
 Keith Galvin, All-Ireland winner with the Dublin senior men's football team
 Rene Gilmartin, Premier League footballer for Watford FC
 Brian Gleeson, actor
 Domhnall Gleeson, actor
 Brian Inglis, BBC journalist
 Pat Ingoldsby (born 1942), Irish poet and TV presenter
 Tom Kettle, the Irish patriot 
 Mark Little, RTÉ News correspondent and businessman
 Susan Loughnane, model and actress
 Niamh McEvoy (and partner Dean Rock) All-Ireland winner with the Dublin senior ladies' footballer and Australian Rules footballer
 Sharon Ní Bheoláin, RTÉ news presenter
 Gabrielle Reidy, actress
 Louise O'Reilly, model and blogger
 Aodhán Ó Ríordáin, Labour Party TD
 Conor Sammon, footballer for the Republic of Ireland national football team
 David Wilkins, Olympic silver medalist and Ireland's only 5-time Olympian.

See also
List of abbeys and priories in Ireland (County Dublin)
List of towns and villages in Ireland

References

External links

 Irelandscape: More pictures of Malahide.
 Malahide Historical Society
 History of Yellow Walls

 
Civil parishes of the barony of Coolock